Trochta is a Czech or Slovak surname. Notable people with the surname include:

 Martin Trochta (born 1979), Slovak ice hockey player 
 Štěpán Trochta (1905–1974), Czech Roman Catholic cardinal and Bishop of Litoměřice

Czech-language surnames
Slovak-language surnames